Afjeh (also Romanized as Afcheh, Efje, and Afche) is a village in Lavasan-e Kuchak Rural District of Lavasanat District of Shemiranat County, Tehran province, Iran. At the 2006 National Census, its population was 685 in 186 households. The following census in 2011 counted 1,079 people in 341 households. The latest census in 2016 showed a population of 1,257 people in 427 households; it was the largest village in its rural district.

References

External links

Shemiranat County

Populated places in Tehran Province

Populated places in Shemiranat County